The 1982 Cal State Fullerton Titans football team represented California State University, Fullerton as a member of the Pacific Coast Athletic Association (PCAA) during the 1982 NCAA Division I-A football season. Led by third-year head coach Gene Murphy, Cal State Fullerton compiled an overall record of 3–9 with a mark of 0–6 in conference play, placing last out of seven teams in the PCAA. The Titans played home games at Titan Field on the Cal State Fullerton campus. The football team shared the stadium with the Cal State Fullerton Titans baseball from 1980 to 1982.

Schedule

Team players in the NFL
No Cal State Fullerton Titans were selected in the 1983 NFL Draft.

The following finished their college career in 1982, were not drafted, but played in the NFL.

References

Cal State Fullerton
Cal State Fullerton Titans football seasons
Cal State Fullerton Titans football